William Penman is the name of:

William H. Penman (1858–1917), American politician
William Penman (rugby union) (1917–1943), Scottish rugby union player
William Penman (footballer) (1886–1907), Scottish footballer
Willie Penman (footballer, born 1922) (1922–2005), Scottish footballer
Willie Penman (footballer, born 1939) (1939–2017), Scottish footballer